Robert Glass (December 4, 1939 – July 21, 1993) was an American sound engineer. He won an Academy Award for Best Sound and was nominated for five more in the same category. He has worked on many films since 1976. Glass was found stabbed to death in his flat in Los Feliz, Los Angeles on July 21, 1993.

Selected filmography
Glass won an Academy Award for Best Sound and was nominated for another five:

Won
 E.T. the Extra-Terrestrial (1982)

Nominated
 A Star Is Born (1976)
 Sorcerer (1977)
 Close Encounters of the Third Kind (1977)
 Hooper (1978)
 1941 (1979)

References

External links
 

1939 births
1993 deaths
American audio engineers
Best Sound Mixing Academy Award winners
Deaths by stabbing in California
20th-century American engineers
People from Los Feliz, Los Angeles